Liptena griveaudi, the Griveaud's liptena, is a butterfly in the family Lycaenidae. It is found in Guinea, Liberia, Ivory Coast and Ghana. The habitat consists of forests.

References

Butterflies described in 1969
Liptena